Live in Paradise is the second live album from New Zealand female vocal group, When the Cat's Away with Sharon O'Neill.

Background and release
When the Cat's Away formed by four female singers at the 1985 New Zealand Music Awards. The group began performing in September 1986 and signed with CBS Records, releasing their debut self titled album in June 1987. The group released a number one single "Melting Pot" in 1988 before disbanding to pursue solo careers in 1990.

In 2001, the group decided to reform to celebrate the 25th anniversary, minus original member Dianne Swan. The group contacted fellow New Zealand artist, Sharon O'Neill and released a cover version of her 1980 single "Asian Paradise", which peaked at number 16, surpassing O'Neill's solo peak position.  A tour commenced in September 2001 and was recorded and released as Live in Paradise in November 2001.

Track listing

Personnel
 Tim Robertson - bass
 Mickey Ututaonga  - drums
 Rob Galley - guitar
 Alan Mansfield - keyboards
 Barbara Griffin - keyboards

Charts

Certifications

References

EMI Records albums
2001 live albums
Collaborative albums
Sharon O'Neill albums
Live albums by New Zealand artists